The 1921–22 Swiss International Ice Hockey Championship was the seventh edition of the international ice hockey championship in Switzerland. HC Château-d’Œx won the championship, as EHC St. Moritz forfeited the final.

First round

Eastern Series

Semifinals 
 EHC St. Moritz - FC/HC Zürich 17:1
 HC Davos - Akademischer EHC Zürich 3:0

Final 
EHC St. Moritz - HC Davos 5:1

EHC St. Moritz qualified for the final.

Western Series

Final 
The final was scheduled for February 12, 1922, in Gstaad. As EHC St. Moritz was unable to travel to Gstaad, the game was awarded to HC Château-d’Œx in a forfeit.

 HC Château-d’Œx - EHC St. Moritz 3:0 (Forfeit)

External links 
Swiss Ice Hockey Federation – All-time results

Inter
Swiss International Ice Hockey Championship seasons